George W. McBride (1854–1911) was a U.S. Senator from Oregon from 1895 to 1901.

Senator McBride may also refer to:

David McBride (born 1942), Delaware State Senate
John C. McBride (1908–1979), Wisconsin State Senate
John R. McBride (1832–1904), Oregon State Senate
Robert McBride (politician) (1856–1934), Northern Irish Senate

See also
Archibald McBryde (1766–1836), North Carolina